Elections to the Rathmines and Rathgar Urban District Council took place on Thursday 15 January 1920 as part of that year's Irish local elections. The election saw Unionists reduced to a majority of 1 on the council. Prior to the election the Rathmines and Rathgar council had been composed almost entirely of Unionists.

Following the election, Robert Benson (Unionist) was elected Chairman, and William Ireland (Unionist) was elected as Vice-Chairman. Mary Kettle, the only Irish Party representative, did not vote for a Chairman, however she voted for Áine Ceannt for Vice-Chairman. Ceannt lost to Ireland by a single vote.

The Local Government (Ireland) Act 1919 had changed the electoral system for local government in Ireland from first-past-the-post to single transferable vote.

Results by party

Results by electoral area

No. 1 West Ward

No. 2 West Ward

No. 1 East Ward

No. 2 East Ward

References

1920 Irish local elections
Elections in County Dublin